In algebraic geometry, a stable curve is an algebraic curve that is asymptotically stable in the sense of geometric invariant theory.

This is equivalent to the condition that it is a complete connected curve whose  only singularities are ordinary double points and whose automorphism group is finite. 
The condition that the automorphism group is finite can be replaced by the condition that it is not of arithmetic genus one and every non-singular rational component meets the other components in at least 3 points .

A semi-stable curve is one satisfying similar conditions, except that the automorphism group is allowed to be reductive rather than finite (or equivalently its connected component may be a torus). Alternatively the condition that non-singular rational components  meet the other components in at least three points is replaced by the condition that they meet in at least two points.

Similarly a curve with a finite number of marked points is called stable if it is complete, connected, has only  ordinary double points as singularities, and has  finite automorphism group. For example, an elliptic curve (a non-singular genus 1 curve with 1 marked point) is stable.

Over the complex numbers, a connected curve is stable if and only if, after removing all singular and marked points, the universal covers of all its components are isomorphic to the unit disk.

Definition 
  has only ordinary double-point singularities
 Every rational component  meets other components at more than  points
 
These technical conditions are necessary because (1) reduces the technical complexity (also Picard-Lefschetz theory can be used here), (2) rigidifies the curves so that there are no infinitesimal automorphisms of the moduli stack constructed later on, and (3) guarantees that the arithmetic genus of every fiber is the same. Note that for (1) the types of singularities found in Elliptic surfaces can be completely classified.

Examples 
One classical example of a family of stable curves is given by the Weierstrass family of curves

where the fibers over every point  are smooth and the degenerate points only have one double-point singularity. This example can be generalized to the case of a one-parameter family of smooth hyperelliptic curves degenerating at finitely many points.

Non-examples 
In the general case of more than one parameter care has to be taken to remove curves which have worse than double-point singularities. For example, consider the family over  constructed from the polynomials

since along the diagonal  there are non-double-point singularities. Another non-example is the family over  given by the polynomials

which are a family of elliptic curves degenerating to a rational curve with a cusp.

Properties 
One of the most important properties of stable curves is the fact that they are local complete intersections. This implies that standard Serre-duality theory can be used. In particular, it can be shown that for every stable curve  is a relatively very-ample sheaf; it can be used to embed the curve into . Using the standard Hilbert Scheme theory we can construct a moduli scheme of curves of genus  embedded in some projective space. The Hilbert polynomial is given by

There is a sublocus of stable curves contained in the Hilbert scheme

This represents the functor

where  are isomorphisms of stable curves. This gives us the moduli stack

See also
Moduli of algebraic curves
Stable map of curves

References 
Artin, M.; Winters, G. (1971-11-01). "Degenerate fibres and stable reduction of curves". Topology. 10 (4): 373–383. doi:10.1016/0040-9383(71)90028-0. ISSN 0040-9383.

Algebraic curves
Moduli theory